Vernice Idda Bellony is a Dominican politician. She formerly worked as a teacher and was a founding member of the United Workers' Party.

She was a Senator from 1990 to 1995 and Member of Parliament for Vieille Case from 1995 until 2000. She was succeeded as MP by future Prime Minister of Dominica Roosevelt Skerrit.

In 2013, the National Corporative Credit Union started a scholarship in her name.

References 

Living people
20th-century Dominica women politicians
Dominica women in politics
Political party founders
20th-century women educators
Dominica educators
Year of birth missing (living people)
21st-century Dominica women politicians